Colonial architecture in Padang, Sumatra, Indonesia, includes the Masjid Muhammadan. Padang has long been a trade center and was a center of pepper trade and gold mine from the 16th to 17th century . Trade extended to India, Portugal,  United Kingdom and the Netherlands. In 1663 the city came under the Dutch authority (Dutch East Indies). The city was under British authority twice, during the war between United Kingdom and the Netherlands (1781-1784) and during the Napoleonic Wars (1795-1815). Afterwards the city was transferred back to the Netherlands. It came under control of Imperial Japan during World War II, and after the war control was eventually transferred to the independent Republic of Indonesia. Padang has also been a center for coffee, salt and textile trade.

Gallery

See also
Colonial architecture in Indonesia

References

Colonial architecture in Indonesia